Created in 1996, the PGA Tour Lifetime Achievement Award honors individuals who have made an outstanding contribution to the PGA Tour over an extended period of time through their actions on and off the golf course.

As of 2016, there have been eleven recipients of the award:

See also
List of golf awards#PGA Tour

References

PGA Tour
Golf awards in the United States
Lifetime achievement awards
Awards established in 1996